Salar de Aguas Calientes IV is a salt pan in Chile. It is adjacent to the Llullaillaco National Park and is within the Central Andean dry puna ecoregion.

The site is significant as a staging area for sandpiper species  and other long-distance migratory birds. Three species of flamingos (Chilean flamingo, Andean flamingo and James's flamingo) can be found here.

See also
Salar de Aguas Calientes

References

Ramsar sites in Chile
Aguas Calientes IV
Protected areas of Antofagasta Region